Alf "Kaka" Martinsen (29 December 1911 – 23 August 1988) was a Norwegian football (soccer) player. At the 1936 Summer Olympics he was a member of the Norwegian team, which won the bronze medal in the football tournament. He also took part in the 1938 FIFA World Cup, but did not play a single match. On club level he started his career in Lillestrøm-based workers' team Fram, before joining Lillestrøm SK.

He coached Lillestrøm SK from 1947 to 1950 and from 1952 to 1953.

References

External links
 
 

1911 births
1988 deaths
Norwegian footballers
Norway international footballers
Lillestrøm SK players
Footballers at the 1936 Summer Olympics
Olympic footballers of Norway
Olympic bronze medalists for Norway
Olympic medalists in football
1938 FIFA World Cup players
Norwegian football managers
Lillestrøm SK managers
Medalists at the 1936 Summer Olympics
Association football forwards
People from Lillestrøm
Sportspeople from Viken (county)